The Taste of Money is a 2012 South Korean erotic thriller film about a conglomerate-owning family.

It triggered controversy and hype with its portrayal of the lives of the privileged in Korean society, exploring themes of sex and money, greed and ambition. A decadent and sensational film that presents biting commentary on the rich and famous, it is Im Sang-soo's seventh film.

Plot
In a luxurious house outside Seoul lives one of the country's richest families: company president Yoon, his wife Baek Geum-ok, their divorced daughter Nami, and son Chul. Yoon is company president but the reins of power are held by his wife Geum-ok, whose aged father was once a powerful businessman, and whom Yoon married for her money and influence. Yoon's private secretary is Joo Young-jak, from humble origins. His current job is making sure a U.S. businessman, Robert Altman, is kept happy with hookers, as part of a major business deal that could prove crucial to the family's fortunes. When Geum-ok sees Yoon having an affair with their Filipina maid, Eva, on her hidden CCTV, she beds Young-jak in revenge. When Chul is arrested for organizing a slush fund for Altman, Geum-ok decides to further punish her husband for his "mistake" in bringing the family's name into public disrepute, by having Eva killed. At the same time, Nami and Young-jak, start an affair. Yoon commits suicide over Eva's death (and takes the blame for his son's activities). After his funeral, Young-jak quits the family, glad to be rid of their influences. He accompanies Eva's coffin to the Philippines, where he is joined on the plane by Nami.

Cast
 Kim Kang-woo as Joo Young-jak
 Youn Yuh-jung as Baek Geum-ok
 Baek Yoon-sik as Chairman Yoon
 Kim Hyo-jin as Yoon Nami
 On Joo-wan s Yoon Chul/Charlie
 Maui Taylor as Eva
 Kwon Byung-gil as Noh, Geum-ok's father
 Hwang Jung-min as Noh's assistant
 Darcy Paquet as Robert Altman
 Kal So-won as Ri-ni

Themes
The Taste of Money first and foremost explores the corrupting influence of money. It is the spiritual sequel of Im's previous film, he calls it "an extension of The Housemaid. You can say that it’s the story of the children of The Housemaid who've grown up." It is his exploration of the world outside the household portrayed in that movie – "What Hoon does outside the home, what kind of parents he has, an expansion of the scope of The Housemaid."

At the end of The Housemaid, a young girl Nami is in shock at witnessing the suicide of her nanny Eun-yi. Fully grown up as a divorcée with a child of her own, Nami is now a main character in this film. She is the only member of the family with a moral sense.

If The Housemaid asserted through a self-immolating woman the impossibility of overturning the classes, The Taste of Money asks the question of whether a beautiful and happy life really might be impossible in a dark society. The conclusion seems to be that money makes it impossible live a happy life, and makes one troubled and abusive even to those nearest.

Production
At 64, Youn Yuh-jung appears in her first on-camera sex scene, a quite unexpected requirement for the actress. "I didn't know there was such a scene when I began," Yoon said. "After I found out, I was really surprised and asked the director, 'Don't you think the audience would be offended to see an old woman naked on screen?'" "The director answered, 'I wrote in the scene intending on that very thing.'"

Release

Cannes
The film was invited to screen in competition at the 2012 Cannes Film Festival, where it received the lowest mark out of the 22 works vying for the Palme d'Or according to Screen International, which aggregates reviews of the most respected critics worldwide. Before and after the closing ceremony, director Im Sang-soo said to various Korean media that his failure to win was a personal "tragedy" and his participation a mistake because he was telling a "very Korean story" that foreigners can't understand.

Critical reception
When released in the United States, The Taste of Money received mixed to negative reviews; it currently holds a 32% "rotten" rating on Rotten Tomatoes. Metacritic, which uses a "normalized" scale to rate films, the film has a 54/100 rating, indicating "mixed or average reviews".

A positive review comes from A.O. Scott of The New York Times, who blurbs: "Even as The Taste of Money swerves toward a frantic climax and a sentimental denouement, it remains intriguing. It feeds an insatiable curiosity about how the other half - or, in current parlance, the 1 percent - lives, and what it shows us is gorgeous, grotesque and disconcertingly human."

Box office
Since its theatrical release on 17 May 2012, the film has grossed over 7.9 billion Korean won (around 6.8 million U.S. dollars), occupying 33% of the domestic box office sales as of 29 May, according to the Korea Box Office Information System (KOBIS). Fifteen foreign distributors have also bought its distribution rights at the film market during the 2012 Cannes Film Festival, among them IFC Midnight, which acquired the film's North American rights.

Awards and nominations
 2012 Buil Film Awards
 Best Music – Kim Hong-jib
 Nomination – Best Supporting Actress – Kim Hyo-jin
 Nomination – Best Supporting Actress – Youn Yuh-jung
 Nomination – Best Cinematography – Kim Woo-hyung
 Nomination – Best Art Direction – Kim Yeong-hee, Kim Joon

See also
 Cinema of South Korea

References

External links
  
 
 
 
 
 

2012 films
2012 thriller drama films
2012 psychological thriller films
South Korean erotic thriller films
2010s Korean-language films
2010s Tagalog-language films
Films directed by Im Sang-soo
Films set in Seoul
Adultery in films
2010s erotic thriller films
Lotte Entertainment films
2012 drama films
2010s English-language films
2010s South Korean films